FM91 is a radio station in Pakistan, covering Karachi, Lahore, Islamabad and Gawadar with its transmissions. It is owned by Air Waves Media (Pvt) Ltd, the media wing of the Interflow Group. The station is headquartered in Karachi with production facilities in Lahore, Islamabad and Multan.

External links
 https://www.fm91.com.pk/

Radio stations in Pakistan
2005 establishments in Pakistan
Radio stations established in 2005